Jan Joosten van Lodensteyn (or Lodensteijn; 1556–1623), known in Japanese as Yayōsu (耶楊子), was a native of Delft and one of the first Dutchmen in Japan, and the second mate on the Dutch ship De Liefde, which was stranded in Japan in 1600. Some of his shipmates were Jacob Quaeckernaeck, Melchior van Santvoort, and William Adams.

Although not allowed to return to the Netherlands, Joosten was allowed to take a Japanese wife and was given a permit to engage in foreign trade. He was privileged to wear the two swords of the samurai and received an annual stipend which placed him (along with Adams) among the ranks of the hatamoto or direct retainers of the shōgun.

Early life in Japan

De Liefde (the Love, sometimes translated as the Charity) departed Rotterdam in 1598, on a trading voyage that was a five ship expedition to the East Indies. After making it through the Straits of Magellan, they became separated, but later rejoined the Hoop (Hope) off the coast of Chile, where some of the crew and captains of both vessels died in an encounter with natives. They decide to leave hostile Spanish waters and sell their woolen cloth cargo in Japan rather than in the warmer Moluccas. The two ships encountered a storm and Hoop was lost. With a decimated and sick crew (only 24 were still alive, and several were dying) the damaged De Liefde made landfall off Bungo (present-day Usuki) on the coast of Kyūshū in April 1600. Portuguese Jesuit missionary priests claimed that the ship was a pirate vessel and that the crew should be executed. The ship was seized on orders of Tokugawa Ieyasu, the daimyō of Edo (modern Tokyo) and the future shōgun, and later the crew was ordered to sail her to Sakai (near Osaka) and then on to Edo.  Some of them were received by Ieyasu, who questioned them at length on European politics, wars and foreign affairs.  The crew eventually went separate ways when some decided they should split the money provided as compensation for their losses of the ship and cargo. The nineteen bronze cannons were unloaded from the ship and, according to Spanish accounts, later used at the decisive Battle of Sekigahara on October 21, 1600 (between Tokugawa forces and their rivals).

Trading
Joosten is reported to have made a fortune in trade between Japan and Southeast Asia, chartering several Red Seal Ships under license from Tokugawa Ieyasu. He was reported by Dutch traders in Ayutthaya to be aboard junks carrying rich cargoes in early 1613. After the establishment of the Dutch Factory in Hirado, he became a middleman between Dutch merchants and the shogunate.

He is also said to have been to Siam on one of his ships, with the Japanese adventurer and author Tenjiku Tokubei. Later, he attempted to return to the Netherlands, but after reaching Batavia, he was denied permission by Dutch authorities to proceed further. He drowned in the South China Sea in 1623 when his ship sank as he was returning to Japan.

Memorials and legacy

For his services, Jan Joosten was granted a house in Edo (now Tokyo) in an area that came to be called "Yayosu Quay" (Yaesu) after him — his name was pronounced yan yōsuten in Japanese (short version: Yayōsu (耶楊子)) — the Yaesu side of Tokyo Station is also named for him.  Yaesu-dōri (Yaesu Avenue) has a monument dedicated to Jan Joosten and his life after his arrival in Japan on De Liefde with his shipmate William Adams.

In 1999 his home town of Delft named Jan Joostenplein (Jan Joosten Square) after him (it is off Van Lodensteynstraat, which is named for a relative). There is a sculpture of "De Liefde" in the courtyard.

See also
William Adams
Shōgun, a 1975 novel
List of foreign-born samurai in Japan
List of Westerners who visited Japan before 1868
Sakoku

References

Notes

External links
Sculpture of "De Liefde" in Jan Joosten Square in Delft in Dutch 
Statue of Ship "De Liefde" in Marunouchi, Tokyo
Yaesu-dōri Monument, Tokyo
Bust of Jan Joosten in Yaesu Shopping Mall, Tokyo

1556 births
1623 deaths
Dutch sailors
Dutch expatriates in Japan
Foreign relations of the Tokugawa shogunate
Hatamoto
Samurai
Foreign samurai in Japan
Deaths due to shipwreck at sea
People from Delft